The Saudi Second Division is the Third level football competition in Saudi Arabia. Qualified three teams to Saudi First Division. In this season, the relegation was canceled after the Second division to 20 clubs.

Final league table

Relegation play-offs
Al-Orobah climbed Saudi First Division after two matches with Al-Nahda after equal points.

First leg

Second leg

References

External links 
 Saudi Arabia Football Federation 
 Saudi League Statistics
 goalzz

Saudi Second Division seasons
2011–12 in Saudi Arabian football